The Boys is an American superhero television series developed by Eric Kripke for Amazon Prime Video. Based on the comic book of the same name by Garth Ennis and Darick Robertson, it follows the eponymous team of vigilantes as they combat superpowered individuals who abuse their abilities. The series features an ensemble cast that includes Karl Urban, Jack Quaid, Antony Starr, Erin Moriarty, Dominique McElligott, Jessie T. Usher, Chace Crawford, Laz Alonso, Tomer Capone, Karen Fukuhara, and Nathan Mitchell.

Originally intended to be a feature-length film, the comic book series adaptation began its development in 2008 with Adam McKay set to direct the film. Due to creative differences between the crew and the studios that picked up the film, the project was left in development hell. The development for the project was revived in 2016 by Cinemax, which announced that it would be reworked as a television series. Kripke was recruited to be the showrunner of the series, while Seth Rogen and Evan Goldberg would be the executive producers. Amazon Prime Video obtained the rights for the series in November 2017, with production starting in May 2018 in Toronto.

The Boys premiered its first season of eight episodes on July 26, 2019. A second season premiered on September 4, 2020, with the third season following on June 3, 2022. In June 2022, the series was renewed for a fourth season. As part of a shared universe, a spin-off web series, Seven on 7, premiered in July 2021, an animated anthology series, Diabolical, premiered in March 2022, and a second live-action television series, Gen V, was ordered in September 2020. The series has received positive reviews and praise for its writing, storyline, humor, and performances of the cast. The series was nominated for six Emmy Awards, including Outstanding Drama Series in 2021.

Premise
The Boys is set in a universe where superpowered individuals, called Supes, are recognized as heroes by the general public and work for a powerful corporation known as Vought International that markets and monetizes them. Outside their heroic personas, most are corrupt, ranging from arrogant and selfish to mass murderers. The series primarily focuses on two groups: the Seven, Vought's premier superhero team, and the Boys, vigilantes looking to bring down Vought and its corrupt superheroes.

The Boys are led by Billy Butcher, who despises all Supes, and the Seven are led by the egotistical and unstable Homelander. At the start of the series, the Boys are joined by Hughie Campbell after a superhero accidentally kills his girlfriend, and the Seven are joined by Annie January, a young and hopeful heroine forced to face the truth about those she admires. Other members of the Seven include the disillusioned Queen Maeve, the drug-addicted A-Train, the insecure Deep, the mysterious Black Noir, and the white supremacist Stormfront. The Boys are rounded out by tactical planner Mother's "MM" Milk, weapons specialist Frenchie, and superpowered test subject Kimiko. Overseeing the Seven is Vought executive Madelyn Stillwell, who is later succeeded by publicist Ashley Barrett. Other superpowered individuals include Victoria Neuman, a congresswoman who publicly opposes Vought while secretly assisting the corporation, and Soldier Boy, Vought's original premier superhero.

Cast and characters

 Karl Urban as William "Billy" Butcher – The leader of the Boys and a former SAS operative who distrusts all Supes. He has a particular hatred towards Homelander, who he believes is responsible for the disappearance of his wife. Luca Villacis and Josh Zaharia portray younger versions of the character.
 Jack Quaid as Hugh "Hughie" Campbell Jr. – A civilian tech specialist who joins the Boys after his girlfriend Robin is killed by A-Train.
 Antony Starr as John / Homelander – The extremely powerful leader of the Seven. Beneath his public image as a noble hero, he is egotistical, megalomaniacal, and cares little about the well-being of those he professes to protect.
 Erin Moriarty as Annie January / Starlight – A superhero with light-based powers and a member of the Seven. One of the few heroes who values protecting society, she questions her loyalty to the Seven after learning of their true character. Maya Misaljevic portrays the young Starlight.
 Dominique McElligott as Maggie Shaw / Queen Maeve (seasons 1–3) – A veteran member of the Seven with superhuman strength and durability. Once desiring to protect innocent lives, she has become disillusioned and suffers from burnout.
 Jessie T. Usher as Reggie Franklin / A-Train – A speedster member of the Seven. A-Train is obsessed with maintaining his status as the fastest speedster in the world, resulting in him becoming addicted to Compound V.
 Laz Alonso as Marvin T. "Mother's" Milk / M.M. – A member of the Boys who is responsible for organizing and planning their operations. Formerly a medic in the United States Marine Corps, he joined the Boys after Soldier Boy caused his grandfather's death and his attorney father worked himself to death attempting to bring Vought down. Elias Leon Leacock portrays the young M.M.
 Chace Crawford as Kevin Moskowitz / The Deep – A member of the Seven who possesses the ability to communicate with aquatic life and breathe underwater. He is looked down upon by the other members of the Seven due to his status as the group's token aquatic hero. Patton Oswalt voices the Deep's gills.
 Tomer Capone as Serge / Frenchie – A member of the Boys and an international arms trafficker skilled in munitions, ordnance, infiltration, and chemistry. Coerced into joining the group to protect his criminal friends, he seeks redemption for his past crimes by fighting against Vought.
 Karen Fukuhara as Kimiko Miyashiro / The Female – A mute member of the Boys with super strength and regenerative healing. Involuntarily injected with Compound V as part of a scheme to create superpowered terrorists, she joins the Boys after they rescue her.
 Nathan Mitchell as Earving / Black Noir – A mysterious member of the Seven who possesses superhuman strength and agility. Formerly a member of Payback, he was badly disfigured during his team's mutiny against Soldier Boy, rendering him mute and forcing him to conceal his physical appearance behind a dark costume. Fritzy-Klevans Destine portrays the young Black Noir in the third season. Although the character is killed by Homelander in the third season, Mitchell will return in the fourth season as a new Black Noir.
 Elisabeth Shue as Madelyn Stillwell (season 1; guest season 2) – A charismatic, scheming vice president at Vought International responsible for managing the superheroes.
 Colby Minifie as Ashley Barrett (season 2–present; recurring season 1) – A publicist for Vought International who later becomes its president.
 Aya Cash as Klara Risinger / Liberty / Stormfront (season 2; guest season 3) – The first successful Compound V subject and member of the Seven with plasma-based abilities. Once a member of the Nazi Party, she holds bigoted views towards minorities and non-Supes.
 Claudia Doumit as Victoria "Vic" Neuman / Nadia (season 3–present; recurring season 2) – A congresswoman who publicly opposes Vought, but is secretly a superpowered assassin with the ability to psychically cause spontaneous combustion. Elisa Paszt portrays the young Nadia.
 Jensen Ackles as Ben / Soldier Boy (season 3–present) – The original premier superhero and leader of Payback. Thought to have been killed during the Cold War, he was secretly betrayed by his team and captured by the Soviets in order for Vought to replace him with Homelander, his biological son.

Episodes

Season 1 (2019)

Season 2 (2020)

Season 3 (2022)

Production

Development
Between 2008 and 2016, a film adaptation of The Boys had been in various stages of development at both Columbia Pictures and Paramount Pictures. Adam McKay expressed interest in directing, and Matt Manfredi and Phil Hay were in charge of the screenplay. McKay expressed interest in casting Russell Crowe as Billy Butcher and Simon Pegg as Hughie, as well as shooting the film in 3D. On April 6, 2016, it was announced that Cinemax was developing a television series adaptation of the comic book. The production was being developed by Eric Kripke, Evan Goldberg, and Seth Rogen. Kripke was set to write the series while Goldberg and Rogen were set to direct. Executive producers were reported to include Kripke, Goldberg, Rogen, Neal H. Moritz, Pavun Shetty, Ori Marmur, James Weaver, Ken Levin, and Jason Netter. Garth Ennis and Darick Robertson were set as co-executive producers. Production companies involved with the series included Point Grey Pictures, Original Film, and Sony Pictures Television.

On November 8, 2017, it was announced that Amazon had given the production a series order for a first season which consisted of eight episodes. The series had reportedly been in development at Amazon for a number of months preceding the series order announcement. It was also reported that the previously announced creative team was still attached to the series. Kripke wanted to retain a sense of reality to the show, and keep the writers disciplined, so he decided "Anything that comes out of this drug is viable, and anything that doesn't we're not allowed to do". He did not want to fall into the overused convention of killing off female characters to motivate the heroes and also saw an opportunity to surprise readers of the comics by changing the story of Butcher's wife Becky. On April 30, 2018, it was announced that Dan Trachtenberg would direct the series' first episode. He replaced Seth Rogen and Evan Goldberg, who dropped out due to scheduling conflicts.

Ahead of the series premiere, on July 19, 2019, at the 2019 San Diego Comic-Con, it was announced that Amazon had renewed the series for a second season, which premiered on September 4, 2020, and that it would consist of eight episodes, like the previous season. Kripke was already starting to write the scripts just before the series premiere revealing that it took "a lot of tiptoeing around expectations for the hit's sophomore outing". The eight scripts for the second season were completed by November 2019.

On July 23, 2020, Amazon announced that the series was being renewed for a third season at the aftershow hosted by Aisha Tyler for the 2020 San Diego Comic-Con@Home. The third season began filming in early 2021 with a then-unknown release date. On October 30, 2020, Kripke revealed that the third season would adapt the miniseries comic book Herogasm, which is centered around superhero orgy festivals. It would be adapted for the season's sixth episode, which would be named "Herogasm" after the miniseries. Kripke stated that "Herogasm" had "the craziest dailies he [had] ever seen" and "that people [were] not ready to watch it". However, the part of the comic book story in which Soldier Boy is depicted as a superhero who has yearly sex with Homelander in an attempt to gain membership in the Seven will not be used, and instead, Soldier Boy was depicted as the "Homelander before Homelander", a superhero from World War II brought out of retirement. Kripke also revealed that instead of portraying Soldier Boy as innocent like he is depicted in the comics, he would be worse than Homelander.

On June 10, 2022, Amazon renewed the series for a fourth season.

Casting
On December 18, 2017, it was announced that Erin Moriarty had been cast in the lead role of Annie January / Starlight. On January 17, 2018, it was reported that Antony Starr, Dominique McElligott, Chace Crawford, Jessie Usher, and Nathan Mitchell had joined the main cast. In March 2018, it was announced that Laz Alonso, Jack Quaid, and Karen Fukuhara had been cast in series regular roles. On April 5, 2018, it was reported that Karl Urban had been cast in the series' lead role of Billy Butcher. On May 16, 2018, it was announced that Elisabeth Shue had been cast in the series regular role of Madelyn Stillwell. On June 25, 2018, it was reported that Tomer Kapon had joined the main cast in the role of Frenchie. On August 30, 2018, it was announced that Jennifer Esposito had been cast in the recurring role of CIA Agent Susan Raynor. On October 5, 2018, it was announced during the annual New York Comic Con that Simon Pegg had been cast in the role of Hughie's father. According to the artist Robertson, Hughie was drawn in the comics to resemble Pegg after he saw Pegg in the sitcom Spaced, but Pegg thought he was too old to play the role of Hughie in the TV series.

On September 5, 2019, Goran Višnjić and Claudia Doumit were cast in recurring roles for the second season. A month later, Patton Oswalt was announced in an unspecified role. Aya Cash was confirmed to be portraying superhero Stormfront in March 2020 following contract negotiations that began when the second season was announced. On August 10, 2020, it was reported that Shawn Ashmore was cast as Lamplighter for the second season. A week later, Jensen Ackles joined the cast for the third season as Soldier Boy. On October 30, 2020, Claudia Doumit and Colby Minifie were promoted to series regulars for the third season. On March 26, 2021, Katia Winter joined the cast in the recurring role of Little Nina for the third season. On June 23, 2021, Miles Gaston Villanueva, Sean Patrick Flanery, and Nick Wechsler were cast as Supersonic, Gunpowder, and Blue Hawk, respectively, for the third season in undisclosed capacities. Two days later, Laurie Holden joined the cast as Crimson Countess in a recurring role for the third season. On October 5, 2021, Frances Turner, Kristin Booth, and Jack Doolan joined the cast as Monique and twins Tessa and Tommy,  the TNT Twins, in recurring roles for the third season. On July 8, 2022, it was announced Nathan Mitchell (who portrayed the masked Black Noir in the first three seasons), despite his character's death in the third season, would continue to portray a new replacement Black Noir in a main capacity in fourth season of the series. On August 1, 2022, it was reported that Cameron Crovetti had been promoted as a series regular while Valorie Curry and Susan Heyward were cast as new series regulars for the fourth season. Later that month, Jeffrey Dean Morgan was cast in an undisclosed role. On December 1, 2022, Rosemarie DeWitt, Rob Benedict, and Elliot Knight joined the cast in undisclosed capacities for the fourth season.

Filming

Despite the series taking place in New York City like in the comics, it was confirmed the filming would be taking place at the city of Toronto in Canada instead. In November 2017, it was announced that the filming for the series was slated to begin filming in 2018 with the hopes of releasing it on 2019. Though the series was mainly shot in Toronto, it was confirmed that additional filming would also be taking place in other cities of Canada such as Mississauga and Hamilton for a few other locations.

Principal photography for the first season took place from May 22 to September 25, 2018, in Toronto, Ontario. The crew filmed at the Roy Thomson Hall in order to get the shots of the exterior of the Seven Tower, which was digitally created through CGI. The building's structure was digitally altered and extended to become the Seven Tower. For the interior of the tower, including some of the rooms and the modern lobby where the fictional company celebrates the corporate parties, the interior of Roy Thomson Hall was used. For Times Square, the crew filmed in Yonge–Dundas Square in Toronto and proceeded to digitally alter it. A-Train's race with Shockwave was filmed at Tim Hortons Field stadium located at Hamilton, Ontario. Lower Bay Station was used for the subway scenes. The crew also filmed at several places of interest through the city such as the Sherbourne Common and the Cathedral Church of St. James. Another shooting location was at the Parkwood Estate in Oshawa, Ontario as the mansion of Dr. Jonah Vogelbaum.

The filming for the second season took place from June 17 to November 13, 2019. For Translucent's funeral ceremony, the crew filmed at the Meridian Arts Centre which is located at the North York district in Toronto. The crew filmed at the Wet 'n' Wild Toronto Waterpark for the scene where the Deep is arrested, with some CGI modifications in order to recreate the series' fictional Splash Zone Sandusky park. For the scenes of the church of the Collective, filming took place at the Scottish Rite Club in Hamilton, Ontario. To create the Sage Grove psychiatric hospital, the crew filmed at the Southwest Centre for Forensic Mental Health Care complex which is located in the city of St. Thomas in Ontario. While filming for the second season a scene was planned to be shot at the Mel Lastman Square, however they were relocated by the Toronto City Council  as the location was close to the place where the Toronto van attack occurred on April 23, 2018.

The filming for the third season took place from February 24 to September 10, 2021. The filming for the season was not affected by the COVID-19 pandemic, though several precautions were implemented to ensure the safety of the cast and crew. The new locations included for the season were Metro Toronto Convention Centre as Vought headquarters, Saint George Manor as the host studio of the fictional reality show American Hero, and Canada's Wonderland Medieval Faire section as Vought Land theme park.

Music

Score albums have been released for each season of the series by Madison Gate Records. Christopher Lennertz served as composer of the show's score. During an interview at the 2019 Comic-Con, he stated that his work for The Boys was the "craziest thing" he has ever done, after collaborating with Seth Rogen for Sausage Party. For the second season's soundtrack, Erin Moriarty provides her own vocals for the song "Never Truly Vanish", which was nominated for an Emmy. The music video for "Never Truly Vanish" was released on YouTube on June 4, 2021. Jessie T. Usher also performed an original song for the second season's soundtrack and on September 1, 2021, the music video for "Faster" was released on YouTube. The third season's soundtrack included two songs performed by Miles Gaston Villanueva, "You've Got a License to Drive (Me Crazy)" and "Rock My Kiss", while Laurie Holden performed "America's Son" which were released on June 3, 2022. On June 17, 2022, another video was released for a song performed by Holden, "Chimps Don't Cry".

Politics 
The seasons explore issues like white nationalism, white supremacy, systemic racism, and xenophobia and Kripke saw this fact as an opportunity to introduce Stormfront, a racist superhero who believes in Nazism. Kripke revealed that unlike the comics where Stormfront is male, the character would be gender swapped for the series with the intention of creating "Homelander’s worst nightmare that would be a strong woman who wasn't afraid of him and proceeded to steal his spotlight." The show contains political satire, and many consider the show to be a critique of conservatism and far-right politics. The show has also made references to corporate corruption, police brutality, sexual harassment, and homophobia. Various analogies have been made with content in the show to Black Lives Matter, the MeToo movement, and comparing Homelander to Donald Trump. Some of the showrunners have said that these analogies are intentional and made to cast a political message.

Release
On September 26, 2018, the official poster for the series was released. On October 5, 2018, in tandem with the series' panel at the annual New York Comic Con, a teaser trailer for the series was released. On January 24, 2019, another teaser trailer was released via Seth Rogen's official Twitter account. The series premiered on July 26, 2019, after another teaser was released. Ahead of the premiere, Amazon renewed The Boys for a second season, which premiered on September 4, 2020. On July 22, Slipknot released a new single called "Solway Firth" with an accompanying music video which featured clips and audio from the show. On June 26, 2020, it was announced that season two would debut on September 4, 2020, with the first 3 episodes available immediately and the rest debuting on a weekly basis. The second season's official trailer was released on August 4, 2020. On January 6, 2022, it was reported that the third season would premiere on June 3, 2022, with the first 3 episodes available immediately and the rest debuting on a weekly basis until the season finale on July 8.

A companion short film titled Butcher, set between the first and second season, was released on September 10, 2020, with Karl Urban reprising his role as Billy Butcher. Characters from The Boys also appeared in an episode of Death Battle! sponsored by Amazon Prime Video, which was released on September 17, 2020.

Home media 
The first two seasons were released on Blu-ray in a six-disc box set by Sony Pictures Home Entertainment on May 17, 2022. The Butcher short film was included as well as deleted scenes and blooper reels.

Reception

Critical reception

On Rotten Tomatoes, the first season holds an approval rating of 85% based on 105 reviews, with an average rating of 7.6/10. The website's critical consensus reads, "Though viewers' mileage may vary, The Boys violent delights and willingness to engage in heavy, relevant themes are sure to please those looking for a new group of antiheroes to root for." On Metacritic, it has a weighted average score of 74 out of 100, based on reviews from 19 critics, indicating "generally favorable reviews".

On Rotten Tomatoes, the second season holds an approval rating of 97% based on 105 reviews, with an average rating of 8.1/10. The website's critical consensus reads, "The Boys comes out swinging in a superb second season that digs deeper into its complicated characters and ups the action ante without pulling any of its socially critical punches." On Metacritic, the season has a weighted average score of 80 out of 100, based on 15 critics, indicating "generally favorable reviews".

On Rotten Tomatoes, the third season has a "Certified Fresh" approval rating of 98% based on 146 reviews, with an average rating of 8.05/10. The website's critical consensus states, "Managing to up the ante on what was already one of television's most audacious satires, The Boys''' third season is both bracingly visceral and wickedly smart." On Metacritic, the season has a weighted average score of 77 out of 100, based on 20 critics, indicating "generally favorable reviews".

Audience viewership
In October 2019, Nielsen announced it had begun tracking viewership of Amazon Prime programs. It said The Boys had attracted 8million total viewers in its first 10 days of release, making it one of the most successful original programs on Amazon Prime. For the second season, the first three episodes drew a 7.2 percent share of streams relative to the top 100 most-watched TV shows on Reelgood within its opening weekend, beating the third season of Stranger Things (5.8 percent) and The Mandalorian (4.4 percent). The show's audience increased 89 percent compared to the first season. Nielsen ratings revealed that 891million minutes of the show has been watched, placing it number three on the Nielsen list, just behind Cobra Kai (2.17billion minutes) and Lucifer (1.42billion minutes). It became the first non-Netflix show to appear on the Nielsen Top 10 Streaming Shows list.

Accolades
PETA awarded the third-season episode "Barbary Coast" its "Tech, Not Terror" award for using a CGI octopus.

Franchise

Spin-offs
The Boys Presents: Diabolical

On December 5, 2021, at the Brazil Comic-Con, Prime Video announced that The Boys Presents: Diabolical, an animated anthology series, had been given an eight-episode series order. On January 18, 2022, it was announced that the series would premiere on March 4, 2022.

Gen V

On September 24, 2020, it was announced that a spin-off centered on a superhero college had been fast-tracked into development upon the ratings success of the series' second season. Described as being "part college show, part Hunger Games", the spin-off is to be set "...at America's only college exclusively for young adult superheroes (and run by Vought International)" and is described as "an irreverent, R-rated series that explores the lives of hormonal, competitive Supes as they put their physical, sexual, and moral boundaries to the test, competing for the best contracts in the best cities". On October 2, 2020, Kripke stated the series would focus on the G-Men team that had been mentioned in the first season, a parody of the X-Men. On September 27, 2021, the untitled spin-off was given a series order by Amazon Studios. Filming of the series, titled Gen V, beginning at the University of Toronto in May 2022 and the Claireville Conservation Area, Brampton in July, intended for an October wrap.

Other media
Vought News Network

Ahead of the premiere of the third season, the series had released video segments in the form of in-universe news reports from the Vought News Network channel on YouTube, titled Seven on 7 with Cameron Coleman. Each of the seven segments contains seven stories that tease events in upcoming episodes and introduce new cast members, and acts as a bridge between Season 2 and 3. Matthew Edison, who plays news anchor Cameron Coleman, also appears in the third season of the series.

Supe Porn
On October 3, 2020, Eric Kripke said that the in-universe pornographic superhero film scenes briefly glimpsed in the second season The Boys episode "Butcher, Baker, Candlestick Maker" had been produced in full, expressing interest in releasing them under the name Supe Porn to the website of the same name, registered to Sony Pictures, as well as supposedly requesting Seth Rogen, Evan Goldberg, Antony Starr and the other followers of his Twitter page to join him in petitioning Prime Video and Amazon Studios to allow the potential web series to be uploaded. Later on, a fictional sex toy online store was added to the website, with a collection of products such as The StarMight Plug and Translucent's Glass Dildo''. At the bottom of the website there is a message saying that its contents are for entertainment purpose only and not actually for sale.

References

External links

 
 Official YouTube Channel for Vought International
 

2019 American television series debuts
2010s American black comedy television series
2010s American comic science fiction television series
2010s American LGBT-related comedy television series
2010s American LGBT-related drama television series
2010s American satirical television series
2010s American superhero comedy television series
2020s American black comedy television series
2020s American comic science fiction television series
2020s American LGBT-related comedy television series
2020s American LGBT-related drama television series
2020s American satirical television series
2020s American superhero comedy television series
TV series
Amazon Prime Video original programming
American crime comedy television series
Dynamite Entertainment adaptations
English-language television shows
LGBT-related superhero television shows
Serial drama television series
Television series by Amazon Studios
Television series by Sony Pictures Television
Television series set in 2019
Television series set in 2020
Television shows based on DC Comics
Television shows filmed in Toronto
Television shows set in New York City
Vigilante television series
Works about the Russian Mafia